Mind If We Make Love to You is an album by the American power pop group Wondermints. It was released in 2002 on Smile Records. The album title, with its intentional lack of punctuation, is a take-off of Mind If I Make Love to You,  an album of 1950s cocktail instrumentals in Darian Sahanaja's record collection.

Multiple configurations of the album have been released, in different parts of the world. Some pressings contain outtakes from the album sessions as well as Wondermints' cover of The Beatles' "Getting Better", which was originally submitted for use in a Philips commercial; the submission was rejected in favor of Gomez's version.

Critical reception
PopMatters wrote that the songs "are more celebration than innovation, simple pleasures arranged in complex manner that delight the ear." The Sun Sentinel wrote that the band sounds "like a cross between Cheap Trick and the Beatles due to their love of power-pop harmonies and trippy lyrics."

Track listing 
 "On the Run" – 3:10
 "Ride" – 4:18
 "Shine on Me" – 4:00
 "Time Has You" – 3:05
 "Another Way" – 3:37
 "Project 11" – 3:41
 "Out of Mind" – 3:47
 "Sweetness" – 4:20
 "If I Were You" – 3:44
 "Something I Knew" – 2:55
 "Listen" – 3:27
 "So Nice" – 3:47
Rev-Ola 2002 reissue bonus tracks
"Out of Mind" (Alternate version) – 3:47
"Ride" (Instrumental) – 4:18

Personnel 
The Wondermints
 Mike D'Amico – percussion
 Darian Sahanaja – keyboards
 Nick Walusko – guitar
with
 Probyn Gregory – multiple instruments

Additional musicians
 Marc Daten – upright bass
 Colin Garner – viola
 Todd Jaeger – theremin
 Ana Lenchantin – cello, "Easter Island Girl"
 David Nolte – bass guitar
 Heidi Rodewald – oboe
 Evie Sands – background vocals on "Shine on Me"
 Debbie Shair – harp and recorder
 Martin St-Pierre – viola
 Brian Wilson – background vocals on "Ride" and "So Nice"

Production
 Ramón Bretón – Oceanview digital mastering
 Mark Linett – Additional recording
 Darian Sahanaja with Steve Stanley – Art Direction|Design
 Taro Yoshida, Robert Matheu, & Shad Sluiter – Photography

References 

2002 albums
Smile Records (United States) albums
Wondermints albums